The 1985–86 Fulham RLFC season was the sixth in the club's history. They competed in the 1985–86 Second Division of the Rugby Football League. They also competed in the 1985–86 Challenge Cup, 1985–86 Lancashire Cup and the 1985–86 League Cup. They finished the season in 9th place in the second tier of British professional rugby league.

1985-86 Second Division league table

Second Division table

1985-86 squad

References

External links
Rugby League Project

London Broncos seasons
London Broncos season
1985 in rugby league by club
1985 in English rugby league
London Broncos season
1986 in rugby league by club
1986 in English rugby league